Diplonevra is a genus of scuttle flies (insects in the family Phoridae). There are at least eight described species in Diplonevra.

Species
Diplonevra aberrans Borgmeier, 1962
Diplonevra cornuta
Diplonevra florea (Fabricius, 1794)
Diplonevra funebris (Meigen, 1830)
Diplonevra gaudialis (Cockerell, 1915)
Diplonevra hamata Borgmeier, 1962
Diplonevra nigricauda Borgmeier, 1969
Diplonevra nitidula (Meigen, 1830)
Diplonevra peregrina Wiedemann, 1830

References

Further reading

 Diptera.info
 NCBI Taxonomy Browser, Diplonevra
 

Phoridae
Platypezoidea genera